PKS may refer to:
 Pammal K. Sambandam, a 2002 Tamil language comedy film
 Państwowa Komunikacja Samochodowa, Polish transport organization
 Parkstone railway station, station code
 Phi Kappa Sigma International Fraternity
 Parkes Catalogue of Radio Sources, an astronomical catalogue
 Polyketide synthases, enzymes
 Prosperous Justice Party (Partai Keadilan Sejahtera), Indonesia
 Serbian Chamber of Commerce